Agastisvarar Temple is a Siva temple in Manakkal Ayyempet in Tiruvarur district in Tamil Nadu (India).

Vaippu Sthalam
It is one of the shrines of the Vaippu Sthalams sung by Tamil Saivite Nayanar Appar.

Presiding deity
The presiding deity is Agastisvarar. The Goddess is known as Soundaranayaki.

Location
The temple is located in Tiruvarur-Kumbakonam road at a distance of 8 km. The temple is facing west.

References

Hindu temples in Tiruvarur district
Shiva temples in Tiruvarur district